Maryland House of Delegates District 1B is one of the 67 districts that compose the Maryland House of Delegates. Along with subdistricts 1A and 1C, it makes up the 1st district of the Maryland Senate. Near the state's western border, District 1B is located entirely within Allegany County. Since 2015, it has been represented by Jason C. Buckel, a Republican.

District 1B elected 2 delegates until the 1994 election, when District 1C was created.

Demographic characteristics
As of the 2020 United States census, the district had a population of 37,328, of whom 31,058 (83.2%) were of voting age. The racial makeup of the district was 31,342 (84.0%) White, 3,542 (9.5%) African American, 80 (0.2%) Native American, 468 (1.3%) Asian, 8 (0.0%) Pacific Islander, 338 (0.9%) from some other race, and 1,543 (4.1%) from two or more races. Hispanic or Latino of any race were 639 (1.7%) of the population.

The district had 23,824 registered voters as of October 17, 2020, of whom 4,105 (17.2%) were registered as unaffiliated, 12,301 (51.6%) were registered as Republicans, 7,054 (29.6%) were registered as Democrats, and 194 (0.8%) were registered to other parties.

Past Election Results

1982

1986

1990

1994
The 1994 election marked the split of District 1B, creating District 1C. Both delegates ran in the Democratic primary, with Betty Workman defeating Kevin Kelly.

1998
Former delegate Kevin Kelly defeated incumbent Betty Workman in the Democratic primary.

2002

2006

2010

2014
In the 2014 Election, Republican Jason C. Buckel won an easy victory over the longtime incumbent, Democrat Kevin Kelly.

2018

References

1B